is a passenger railway station in located in the city of Kaizuka, Osaka Prefecture, Japan, operated by West Japan Railway Company (JR West).

Lines

Station layout
The station consists of two opposed side platforms connected to the station building by a footbridge. The station is staffed.

Platforms

History
Izumi-Hashimoto Station opened on 16 June 1930. With the privatization of the Japan National Railways (JNR) on 1 April 1987, the station came under the aegis of the West Japan Railway Company.

Station numbering was introduced in March 2018 with Izumi-Hashimoto being assigned station number JR-R42.

Passenger statistics
In fiscal 2019, the station was used by an average of 3212 passengers daily (boarding passengers only).

Surrounding area
 Aeon Kaizuka store
 Osaka Prefectural Road No. 30 Osaka Izumi Sennan Line

See also
List of railway stations in Japan

References

External links

 Izumi-Hashimoto Station Official Site

Railway stations in Osaka Prefecture
Railway stations in Japan opened in 1939
Kaizuka, Osaka